Phyllognathopodidae is a family of crustaceans belonging to the order Harpacticoida.

Genera:
 Allophyllognathopus Kiefer, 1967
 Neophyllognathopus Galassi & De Laurentiis, 2011
 Parbatocamptus Dumont & Maas, 1988
 Phyllognathopus Mrázek, 1893

References

Harpacticoida